Republika Power Plant is a power plant situated near the city of Pernik, western Bulgaria. It has an installed capacity of 180 MW. There is a €6,500,000 reconstruction plan undergoing for the fifth generator. The plant suffered damage during the 2012 Pernik earthquake, with one of its chimneys partially collapsing, leading to a reduced capacity. The chimney was later demolished, as evidenced by Google Maps satellite images.

See also

 Energy in Bulgaria

References

External links
Republika TPP is undergoing reconstruction

Coal-fired power stations in Bulgaria
Buildings and structures in Pernik Province
Pernik